Coquitlam-Burke Mountain is a provincial electoral district in British Columbia, Canada. It was established by the Electoral Districts Act, 2008, created out of parts of Port Moody-Westwood, Coquitlam-Maillardville and Port Coquitlam-Burke Mountain. It was first contested in the 2009 election, in which Liberal Douglas Horne was elected its first MLA.

MLAs

Election results 

|}

References

British Columbia provincial electoral districts
Politics of Coquitlam
Provincial electoral districts in Greater Vancouver and the Fraser Valley